The Symphony No. 8 in E-flat major, Op. 83, was composed by Alexander Glazunov in 1905, and was published two years later. This four-movement symphony (his last one) was premiered on December 22, 1906 in Saint Petersburg, the composer conducting.  It was an important influence on Igor Stravinsky's Symphony in E-flat.

It is in four movements:
Allegro moderato ( = 100)
Mesto ( = 50–54)
Allegro ( = 120)
Finale: Moderato sostenuto ( = 66)

References

External links

Symphonies by Alexander Glazunov
1905 compositions
Compositions in E-flat major